Austrian Sign Language, or Österreichische Gebärdensprache (ÖGS), is the sign language used by the Austrian Deaf community—approximately 10,000 people (see Krausneker 2006).

Classification 

ÖGS and Hungarian Sign Language seem to be related for historical reasons (First School for the Deaf in Vienna), but forms a cluster with neighboring languages rather than with ÖGS.  Although there are no detailed studies of the extent of relatedness, ÖGS shares aspects of its grammar with German Sign Language and Swiss Sign Language, while the vocabulary differs (see Skant et al. 2002);  Wittmann (1991) places it in the French Sign Language family).

Research

Linguistic research on ÖGS started in the 1990s and is primarily conducted at the University of Klagenfurt and University of Graz. The Alpen-Adria-Universität Klagenfurt (AAU) worked on the "Deaf learning" project (September 1, 2015 – August 31, 2018) financed under Erasmus+ as a cooperation for innovation and the exchange of good practices, strategic Partnerships for adult education aimed at deaf adults with Austrian Sign Language as their first natural language and the German written language as their second language with the aim of raising the level of literacy. The program was expanded by Eramus+ after its completion to promote achieving higher social, educational and financial positions through better access to the written language proficiency with the "Deaf language awareness" project (September 1, 2018 – July 7, 2021) by developing online courses for independent learning in ÖGS and written German text.

Legal aspects

After a 15-year effort by the Deaf community, ÖGS was legally recognized by the Austrian Parliament on September 1, 2005.

Fingerspelling

ÖGS possess hundred of signs, of which 26 signs represent single letters similar to the basic written German alphabet, 3 signs represent letter-diacritic combinations (Ä/ä, Ö/ö, Ü/ü) using the umlaut and 1 sign represents the German "sch" (trigraph). As an initiative from the European Social Fund in Austria and Equalizent, an online video dictionary was created to teach the Fingerspelling and the most common signs with the help of a 3D-Avatar called SiMAX  from Sign Time.

Associations
The Austrian Deaf community is represented by the Austrian Federation of the Deaf (the Österreichischer Gehörlosenbund).

There is one nationwide association for professional interpreters of ÖGS.

See also 
 Austrian-German
 Austro-Bavarian
 Austrian Federation of the Deaf

References

Further reading
 Krausneker, Verena (2006) taubstumm bis gebärdensprachig. Die Österreichische Gebärdensprachgemeinschaft aus soziolinguistischer Perspektive. Klagenfurt, Drava 
 ÖGLB, Österreichischer Gehörlosenbund (2003) ÖGS-Basisgebärden. Basisvokabular der Österreichischen Gebärdensprache. Wien
 ÖGLB, Österreichischer Gehörlosenbund (2004) Mein Tor zur Welt der Gehörlosen. Wien 
 ÖGLB, Österreichischer Gehörlosenbund (2004) Mein Fingeralphabet.Das Finger-ABC für Kinder. Wien
 ÖGLB, Österreichischer Gehörlosenbund (2004) Mein erstes Gebärdenbuch. Österreichische Gebärdensprache für Kinder. Wien
 ÖGLB, Österreichischer Gehörlosenbund (2004) Erstes Gebärdenbuch für Jugendliche. Wien
 ÖGLB, Österreichischer Gehörlosenbund (2004) Zweites Gebärdenbuch für Jugendliche. Wien
 ÖGLB, Österreichischer Gehörlosenbund (2005) 1. Diskriminierungsbericht der österreichischen Gebärdensprachgemeinschaft. Wien
 ÖGLB, Österreichischer Gehörlosenbund (2005) Medizinisches Handbuch ÖGS. Wien.
 ÖGLB, Österreichischer Gehörlosenbund (2006) 2. Diskriminierungsbericht der österreichischen Gebärdensprachgemeinschaft. Wien
 Skant, Andrea, Franz Dotter, Elisabeth Bergmeister, Marlene Hilzensauer, Manuela Hobel, Klaudia Krammer, Ingeborg Okorn, Christian Orasche, Reinhold Ortner & Natalie Unterberger (2002) Grammatik der Österreichischen Gebärdensprache. Veröffentlichungen des Forschungszentrum für Gebärdensprache und Hörgeschädigtenkommunikation der Universität Klagenfurt: Band 4: 2002  (Publikationen und Produkte)

External links
https://web.archive.org/web/20150910051553/http://sign-it.at/ - video dictionary of ÖGS signs
http://www.gebaerdenwelt.at/ - daily news in ÖGS

French Sign Language family
Languages of Austria
Deaf culture in Austria